FPX may refer to:
 .fpx, the FlashPix file extension
 Financial Process Exchange, the direct debit system of Malaysia
 FunPlus Phoenix, a Chinese professional esports organization based in Beijing
 Portuguese Chess Federation (Federação Portuguesa de Xadrez)